is a railway station in the town of Taketoyo, Chita District, Aichi Prefecture, Japan, operated by Central Japan Railway Company (JR Tōkai).

Lines
Taketoyo Station is the terminal station of the Taketoyo Line, and is located 19.3 kilometers from the opposing terminus of the line at Ōbu Station.

Station layout
The station has a single side platform. The station has automated ticket machines, TOICA automated turnstiles and is unattended.

Adjacent stations

|-
!colspan=5|Central Japan Railway Company

Station history
Taketoyo Station was opened on March 1, 1886 as a passenger and freight station on the Japanese Government Railways (JGR), but was relocated to its present location in June 1892. Freight operations were relocated to Taketoyo-Minato station from April 1, 1930, but that station was closed in August 1965. The JGR became the Japan National Railway (JNR) after World War II. Freight operations were discontinued from November 15, 1975. With the privatization and dissolution of the JNR on April 1, 1987, the station came under the control of the  Central Japan Railway Company. Automatic turnstiles were installed in May 1992, and the TOICA system of magnetic fare cards was implemented in November 2006.

Station numbering was introduced to the Taketoyo Line in March 2018; Taketoyo Station was assigned station number CE09.

Passenger statistics
In fiscal 2018, the station was used by an average of 677 passengers daily (boarding passengers only).

Surrounding area
Taketoyo Elementary School

See also
 List of Railway Stations in Japan

References

External links
Official home page 

Railway stations in Japan opened in 1886
Railway stations in Aichi Prefecture
Taketoyo Line
Stations of Central Japan Railway Company
Taketoyo